Asher Clayton Taylor (February 21, 1842January 20, 1922) was a career United States Army officer who served in the American Civil War and the Spanish–American War.  He retired with the rank of brigadier general in 1904.

Biography
Taylor was born in New York on February 21, 1842. He moved to LeRoy, Wisconsin, as a young boy and was educated there, until his college education at Hillsdale Collage, Michigan.

As a young man, he enlisted for duty in the American Civil War and served as a corporal in Company D of the 3rd Wisconsin Infantry Regiment.  When the regiment re-enlisted as a veteran regiment in 1864, Taylor was the regiment's sergeant major.  By the end of the war, he was commissioned a first lieutenant and appointed adjutant to the colonel of the regiment.

After the war, he was offered a commission in the regular army and served with the 15th U.S. Infantry Regiment through their Indian Wars campaigns in Colorado and New Mexico.

At the outbreak of the Spanish–American War, he was a colonel and served in the Cuban Campaign in and around Havana.  Through his later years, he was assigned to the Artillery Corps and was regarded as an expert in light artillery.  He was promoted to brigadier general in 1904 and retired that year.  After his retirement, he and his wife toured the world, before settling down at Cottonwood, California.

Personal life
In 1872, Taylor married Mary Jane Branagan, whose family were pioneer settlers of California.  General Taylor and his wife had seven children together, though none of them survived him. Taylor, his wife, and their seven children are interred together at Arlington National Cemetery.

References

People of Wisconsin in the American Civil War
United States Army generals
Union Army soldiers
Burials at Arlington National Cemetery
People from Dodge County, Wisconsin
1842 births
1922 deaths